Canarium album is a tree species in the genus Canarium and the family Burseraceae, found in Indo-China; the Catalogue of Life does not record any sub-species.

Canarium album produces a fruit commonly called Chinese olive or white olive, though it has no relation to Olea; it is consumed in Vietnam (Vietnamese: trám trắng, fruit quả trám), Thailand (where it is known as nam liap, samo chin or kana) and in China.

The pulp of the tree's fruit and its seeds are edible, with a strong resinous flavor when they are fresh. Culinary oil can be extracted from the seed. Preserves can be made with the fruit, both sweet like jam or pickled preserves.  In China, a pickle called olive vegetable
(), made from a mix of Canarium album fruit and mustard greens, is commonly used as a flavoring for congee and fried rice.

Mostly cultivated in Thailand, cultivation has been introduced on a smaller scale to Fiji and northern Queensland in Australia. Its fruit, resin and seed are exported to Europe where they are used in the manufacture of varnish and soap.

Gallery

References

External links
 
 

album
Flora of China
Flora of Indo-China
Trees of Vietnam